Hill International, Inc. is an American construction consulting firm.  Founded in 1976, the company's corporate headquarters are in Philadelphia, Pennsylvania, U.S. Hill provides program and project management, construction management, cost engineering and estimating, quality assurance, inspection, scheduling, risk management, and claims resolution and avoidance services to clients with major construction projects worldwide.

Hill has participated in over 10,000 project assignments with a total construction value of more than $600 billion. The firm was ranked as the 4th largest construction management firm-for-fee in the United States according to Building Design+Construction magazine in 2022.

History
The company was founded in 1976 by Irvin E. Richter and Michael W. C. Emerson, P.E. Richter had worked in Construction Claims Consulting at Wagner, Hohns, Inglis Inc., Mount Holly, New Jersey from 1974 to 1976 before he started the firm to provide similar services. Richter soon bought out Emerson and named himself the "Vice-President", despite being the only employee other than his executive assistant. The first offices were in Richter's home in Willingboro, New Jersey.  The name "Hill" was to designate the preferred location of the company office in Cherry Hill, New Jersey. However, that move never took place, and a short time later the office moved to the Levitt Building in Willingboro where it stayed until 2002.

Richter immediately began a series of acquisitions. One was Construction Management Services, Inc. (CMS), (a Critical Path Method [CPM] scheduling company) i. CMS was formed by A. James Waldon, Dwight Zink, and William De Vos. Several of the principals at CMS as well as an employee, Joseph J. Ranieri, had worked at Mauchly Assoc., a consulting company founded by Dr. John W. Mauchly. Zink and Ranieri, were two of the early practitioners of CPM, an early application of computers to construction and procurement scheduling. They helped establish CMS, a CPM consulting firm that worked extensively in scheduling construction projects and forensic scheduling analysis and both worked at Hill after the acquisition.

Government contracting
Hill prospered in the late 1970s, in part because of the explosion of local construction projects funded by the newly established United States Environmental Protection Agency (EPA). The EPA required the use of the Federal Acquisition Regulation and claims (as "Requests for Equitable Adjustments") became the new norm for local procurement. The firm had about 20 full-time employees by the end of 1979. In 1980 the firm opened its first branch office in Washington, D.C., and began to serve the U.S. government and government contractors from this location.By the 1980s, another series of events in the construction industry fueled a further increase in construction claims and the growth of Hill - the construction of numerous nuclear power plants. The construction of these plants was highly regulated and resulted in overruns in cost and schedule for almost every plant built. Over 46 plants had been commissioned in the 1980s alone. At this time, the Nuclear Power Generating Industry was at the end of a rapid increase in constructing plants and began to terminate many projects. This decline had already begun due in large part to nuclear accidents at Three Mile Island and Chernobyl. This brought another explosion in construction claims for schedule and cost overruns as well as termination claims, including utilities, engineers, and nuclear reactor manufacturers as well as contractors and subcontractors. At this time, Hill brought in William J. Doyle to oversee the growth in nuclear related claims business. Doyle had built a small mechanical contracting company into one of the largest mechanical contractors in the nation, General Energy Resources, Inc., whose core business was subcontracting at nuclear power plant projects. Doyle then served as Senior VP of Northrop Corporation before he became an executive of Hill overseeing much of the nuclear claims work as well as other multi-million-dollar projects.

In the 1980s and 1990s, Doyle oversaw the beginnings of the expansion from a claims consulting firm into a project management company. Hill's initial ventures into Project Management were through a concept called "Troubled Project Turnaround". In 1981, Hill was involved in supporting a major litigation at the Tropicana Casino & Resort Atlantic City where what was supposed to be a $180 million project almost doubled to $300 million. The firm provided technical expertise in resolving the claims and litigation support, and also helped manage the completion of the construction. According to Richter, "... we became a construction manager as a result of that project and eventually also became involved in project management and program management afterward."

Hill continued to expand its management role (re: "Troubled Project Turnarounds") at the City of Niagara Falls, New York. Hill helped the city gain control of the stalled construction of its wastewater treatment plant project and maintain liaison with state and federal regulatory agencies. Hill then acted as the city's construction manager (CM) to complete the reconstruction of the wastewater treatment plant. The city had actually been one of Hill's first clients in 1977 when it hired the firm after having been impressed by its work for a contractor in a claims situation with the city. Similar troubled project CM work took place at the Point Pleasant, PA, Water Intake and Pump Station.

During this time frame Hill became one of the initial Project Management Oversight contractors (PMOC) for the Federal Transit Administration (FTA) during the construction of the Sacramento (CA) Light Rail. Hill next worked for the FTA on the LA Metro. Hill was now included in this FTA list of PMOCs, who were mostly large, established CM firms such as Daniel, Mann, Johnson, & Mendenhall, Fluor Daniel, Parsons Brinckerhoff, and Stone & Webster, among others. By 1984 Hill had opened a Los Angeles Office.

In 1988, Hill expanded its services by acquiring first Gibbs & Hill, an engineering / design firm in New York City. Also in 1988, it entered the environmental market by purchasing Kaselaan & D'Angelo (K&D), an air-quality design firm that specialized in asbestos clean-up consulting. The acquisitions raised company revenue to $200 million and increased company size to more than 2,000 employees.

Hill entered the program management service sector in 1991 when it became program manager for the New Jersey Turnpike Widening Program (Interchanges 11–14).  This $543 million project involved 9 design sections, 7 construction sections, and more than 50 separate construction and procurement contracts.

Despite these successes, the acquisitions of the design and environmental firms proved ultimately unsuccessful and Hill sold Gibbs & Hill in three parts to United Engineers, then a subsidiary of Raytheon, in 1993 and K&D to ATC Environmental, of Mount Laurel, NJ, in 1995.

At this time, and partially as a result of Hill's investment in Gibbs & Hill and K&D, which caused net losses, Hill's bank financing disappeared. As Hill's business fell off with sales bottoming out at $25 million and the workforce declining to 250 employees, in late 1995 Hill's major creditor, First Fidelity Bank, N.A., sought immediate accelerated payment of a loan of $6.1 million.  The bank alleged that an event of default had occurred when Hill sold off Gibbs & Hill that had served as part of the collateral for these loans. If the bank won the litigation, Hill would have become bankrupt, but Hill prevailed.  Then Hill began a successful turnaround by concentrating on its core construction claims business and seeking to expand its growing construction / project / program management sector.

International expansion
Hill has been "International" since its beginnings. Some CMS clients who became Hill clients were involved with projects in Europe and Africa, including an early iron pellet plant project (in the late 1970s).

In 1981, Hill represented a Filipino labor contractor providing on-site claims and dispute resolution services at King Khalid Military City, a project being built in Saudi Arabia by the United States Army Corps of Engineers. The form of contract was the FAR.

Hill first attempted to open a non-field overseas office in London in 1981 when it hired John A.W. Tanner, an executive with Pullman Swindell (now Swindell Dressler International Co.) The venture was ultimately unsuccessful and the office closed in 1985.

However, Hill continued to expand its international claims work. Its contacts in the nuclear plant claims arena included General Electric (who used Hill services on its Boiling Water Reactor). GE's overseas subsidiaries also used Hill's services on several claims in Egypt, including the Abu Sultan Power Plant and other projects in the early 1980s. The firm assisted a Spanish joint venture in evaluating their potential claims against the government of Kuwait on a major road modernization project in Kuwait City. This continued business in the Middle East led Hill's management to target this region for an overseas office.

By this time, in 1983, Richter had authored a book, International Construction Claims, Avoiding and Resolving Disputes and the international momentum landed Hill in Abu Dhabi with an independent overseas office that was turning a profit from the start. Hill had landed the role as a lead consultant for the Abu Dhabi Claims Committee.

Hill continued to pursue offices elsewhere. In the early 1990s, it was selected by Bechtel to help guide the completion of the Channel Tunnel Project that had begun in 1986. But as work progressed, the owner, Eurotunnel, and the Anglo-French consortium responsible for design and construction, TransManche Link, were plagued by severe cost, schedule, and safety problems. In 1990, the banks funding the project became involved. When it became clear the project was at risk, Eurotunnel called on Bechtel to get the project back on track. Hill was hired by this project rescue team to perform claims analysis and mitigation, and had a project team working with Eurotunnel for several years and eventually opened an independent office in London. Hill sought to bring in qualified European staff to run their European offices. It hired Raouf Ghali, who was educated in the U.S. Ghali had recently been hired by Hill and had worked leading Hill on the Petronas Twin Tower Project in Kuala Lampur, Malaysia. Ghali, then working in the London office (but also working from his home base of Athens, Greece),  expanded the Construction Management group of Hill. For example, thefirm began work on the Athens Metro, the National Library of Latvia, and, in 2002, the Palm Islands Project in Dubai. Hill moved its corporate headquarters from Willingboro to Marlton, NJ, in 2002. By 2004, Hill had about 500 professionals working in 25 offices worldwide. 

From 2002 to 2006, Hill's revenue rose from $73 million to $197 million, a 170% increase, with 55% percent of its revenue coming from Europe and the Middle East.

Becoming a public company via a reverse merger
Richter had always envisioned Hill as a public company. The company's financial difficulties of the mid-1990s, however, made the approach of going public through an IPO unattainable. In 2004 Arpeggio Acquisition Corporation of New York was formed in April as a "blank-check company"—meaning its business activities had not been determined. It was established for the sole purpose of buying a company within 18 to 24 months of its initial public offering. While it had not determined what type of company it wanted to buy, it had focused on buying one in the U.S. or Canada.

On December 5, 2005, Arpeggio and Hill announced that they entered into a merger agreement. Under the terms of the agreement, Hill's shareholders received 14.5 million shares of the common stock of Arpeggio at closing, and owned 63.6% of the combined entity. When the deal closed on June 28, 2006, Arpeggio changed its name to Hill International, Inc. and on June 29 began trading as HINT on Nasdaq.  Hill's stockholders nominated six members of the combined company's nine-member Board of Directors. Richter remained chairman and CEO of the combined company, and Hill's then-current management team also remained in place.

When HINT began trading on Nasdaq on June 29, 2006, the price of HINT was $5.30 per share. At the end of the year the price was $7.15 per share. Hill achieved record revenue of $197 million with record net income of $11.3 million. Most of this was due to organic growth in the Project Management sector of the company. With the cash infusion from going public Hill could now begin a series of acquisitions and mergers that would grow the company as Richter had envisioned previously.

Hill made one immediate major acquisition in 2006 after going public – the purchase of J. R. Knowles (the largest construction claims company in the world) for $13 million. As a result, Hill assumed the title of the largest claims firm in the world. The Knowles acquisition also provided access to new markets in Southeast Asia, Australia, and Canada.

In 2007, Hill implemented its plan to acquire additional project management companies, notably KJM & Associates Ltd., Bellevue, WA. This move opened up new markets to Hill in the western U.S. This acquisition and continued organic growth resulted in record revenues of $290 million (with record net income of $14.1 million) in 2007. The stock soared to close the year at $14.17 per share.

Move to the New York Stock Exchange
The company listed on the New York Stock Exchange (NYSE) in 2008. Now designated as HIL, it began trading on February 22, 2008 at $13.14 per share and six months later achieved its highest price ever at $19.30 per share on August 28, 2008. The company strategy continued to emphasize acquisitions to fuel and supplement its organic growth: Hill completed over 20 acquisitions of project management and claims consulting businesses worldwide, gaining entry/expanding into the United Kingdom, Spain, Mexico, Poland, Australia, Brazil, South Africa, and Turkey.

In the period 2008–2011, Hill acquired the following companies:

John Shreeves Holdings, Ltd. London,
(a majority stake in) Gerens Management Group, S.A., Madrid, 
Euromost, one of the leading project management firms in Poland, 
PCI, a firm that provided scheduling, construction claims, project management support, and software (for project management and scheduling) sales and support services throughout the western U.S.,
 Chitester, a firm that provided construction claims and dispute resolution services nationally, based in Tampa,
 Boyken International, Inc., a project management, cost estimating, and construction claims firm headquartered in Atlanta,
 McLachlan Lister, a consulting firm in Australia,
TRS Consultants, Inc., is a construction management firm headquartered in San Ramon, California, and
(a majority stake in) Engineering, S.A., one of the largest project management firms in Brazil.

Through these acquisitions Hill expanded the reach of its markets to include Latin America and the Caribbean, the western U.S., and continued expansion into central and eastern Europe.

The Arab Spring crisis
Hill was not impressing investors and after the economic collapse of 2008–2009, HIL  traded within a narrow range around $5 per share for eight years. For 30 years prior to going public, Hill was essentially a family-run business. Irvin Richter was in charge, with almost all stock controlled by his family. In 1995, Richter's son David joined Hill as vice president and General Counsel. David Richter became President of the Project Management Group in 2001, then served as the President of Hill from 2004 until August 11, 2016. He also served as the Chief Operating Officer from April 2004 to 2014, when he replaced his father as CEO. This situation resulted in compensation packages some investors felt were unfair. For example, when Hill showed an operating loss of $3.895 million, the CEO, COO, CFO, and Presidents of the two operating divisions were paid $3.715 million.

Due to the civil unrest of the Arab Spring, which commenced in Libya in February 2011, Hill suspended its operations and demobilized practically all of its personnel from the country. Libya had been one of Hill's largest markets (accounting for almost 10% of backlog at Year End 2010). In 2012, following the lack of payments for the work, HIL reserved a $59.9 million receivable from the Libyan Organization for Development of Administrative Centres. Since then, payments totaling only $9.5 million have been received, resulting in a write-off of the rest of the receivable. The delays in and lack of payments put a considerable strain on liquidity, which meant Hill had to fund operations through debt financing and equity dilution. In September 2016, Hill defaulted on their debt, which precluded utilizing any of the $2.5 million of borrowing capacity still available until a waiver was received.

Hill actually recovered from the Libya loss in succeeding years. Revenues grew from 2012, driven mainly by organic growth in the Middle East. While operating profits rebounded nicely, shareholders for the most part did not see a corresponding increase in share price as most of the profit gains were offset by interest expenses from a heavy debt burden and significant stock dilution in order to reduce that debt burden. However, top management continued to benefit. In 2014, when Irvin Richter retired, the CEO, COO, CFO, and Presidents of the two operating divisions were paid $4.73 million, not including over $1.175 million paid to the retiring Richter for "unused vacation". Between 2011 and 2014, Hill had a net loss for three of the four years.

The interest burden reduced the rate of acquisitions by Hill, but did not stop them.  Between 2012 and 2017, the firm acquired the following companies:
Binnington Copeland Associates, a firm with offices in Cape Town and Johannesburg,
Collaborative Partners of Boston,
Cadogans of Scotland, and
IMS, a Turkish project management firm.

Proxy battle
On May 4, 2015 DC Capital made public a letter to Hill's management offering to pay a minimum of $5.50 to take the company private. In their offer to Hill, DC referenced two concerns: disproportionate exposure in the Middle East, and the lack of sufficient fiscal discipline to maximize shareholder value, particularly excessive management compensation.  The next day, Hill's board rejected this offer and implemented a poison pill, which was later rescinded.  Again in December 2015, DC Capital partners proposed to acquire the company for a reduced offer of $4.75 per share, which still represented a premium in excess of 45%.  Again, the board rejected the offer.

On May 14, 2015 Bulldog Investors disclosed a 5% position accumulated in Hill since the end of 2014. Most of the shares were bought in the two months leading up to the DC offer. They then continued buying after the offer became public and sought to put two directors on the company's board.

Management eventually won this proxy battle, and promised to cut costs, increase margins, and improve shareholder returns. Bulldog Investors believed these promises were not being met and in 2016 launched a second proxy battle, running on the agenda that Hill's stock price was significantly below its intrinsic value due to what they called the "Richter Discount". Management fought aggressively to beat the activists, including postponing the company's annual meeting, but Hill eventually settled and put Bulldog's nominees on the board. As part of that move, Irvin Richter fully retired, and Craig Martin, former president and CEO of Jacobs Engineering, eventually replaced David Richter as chairman.

As part of the management defense in 2016, Hill put the Claims Consulting Group up for sale beginning in 2015 in an attempt to get a cash infusion to pay off the current debt and concentrate on growing the Construction/Project/Program Management Group. However, the sale did not occur until after the Proxy Battle of 2016. On December 20, 2016, Hill announced that it had entered into a definitive stock purchase agreement to sell its Construction Claims Group to Bridgepoint Development Capital, part of the international private equity group Bridgepoint, for $147 million in an all-cash transaction. The final deal closed on May 5, 2017, with a reduction in the purchase price of $7.0 million, to $140.0 million in cash, an increase of $3.0 million in the working capital that Hill must deliver to Bridgepoint, from $35.4 million to $38.4 million, and additional specific indemnification of the buyer.[8] The former Hill Construction Consulting Group is now doing business as HKA.

Activist management 
The Bulldog Investors proxy battle ended in the election of three independent directors to the board replacing three entrenched directors, another director resigned, majority voting for the election of directors was implemented, the company committed to reduce its board to seven members over time, and an annual advisory vote on executive compensation was instituted.

After the sale of the Construction Claims Group was finalized in May 2017, David L. Richter, CEO since 2014, stepped down from the role and left the firm. Named as interim CEO was Paul Evans, who joined Hill's board in August 2016 as one of three new members nominated by Hill activist investor Bulldog Investors. Evans had been vice president, Chief Financial Officer, and Treasurer of MYR Group. Evans stated that, "This company on a contract margin basis does very well. Something happens with this company when we take that number down to the bottom line. So we're going to look at all costs and where we have to make adjustments."

Following the sale of the Construction Claims Group, Hill underwent several major layoffs in administrative staff.[9] Hill was then unable to complete required quarterly operating statements since the first quarter of 2017. As a result of its failure to file its Quarterly Report on Form 10-Q for the fiscal quarter ended June 30, 2017 ("Form 10-Q") (or any subsequent Form 10-Qs), the NYSE informed the Company that, under the NYSE's rules, the company had six months from August 15, 2017 to file the Form 10-Q with the SEC. This extension was further extended to July 16, 2018. Hill was also late submitting its Form 10-Ks and annual report. Hill stated the reason for these delays was that it was continuing to compile information regarding, and complete the proper accounting and related tax treatment of, the sale of the Construction Claims Group which was completed in May 2017, and to assess the company's accounting for comprehensive income (loss) in conjunction with the accounting for the sale of the Construction Claims Group.However, through this period of adjustment, and despite a call to re-focus on U.S. projects, Hill continued to win more international (11) than U.S. (8) contracts for its services.

Refocus on growth 
Hill completed its restatement, became current with its filings, and named Raouf Ghali as the company's permanent CEO in late 2018. Entering 2019, and with the departure of the activist management team, the company is re-focusing on profitable growth and re-emphasizing its core project management businesses, while also expanding into facilities management and advisory services. 

During the fourth quarter of 2018, Hill announced several new projects. These include providing program management and inspection services for the City of Cleveland on Dominion Energy’s $4 billion pipeline Infrastructure Replacement Program,  selection by the European Bank for Reconstruction and Development to provide, as a leader of a joint venture, construction supervision services for the railway rehabilitation and upgrade of the Fushë Kosovë - Hani i Elezit railway line, and a contract to provide construction management services to Supernova Participações for the construction of Expo Park Pampulha, an $80 million multi-purpose complex in Brazil.

Hill also announced the return of David Richter (who remains a major shareholder) as a Board Observer on December 6, 2018. Hill International in March 2019 also sued its founder Irvin Richter (for over $1 million) over two unauthorized transactions, made while serving as chairman and CEO in 2010 - an investment in incNetworks Inc., a telecommunications start-up, using funds from Hill, and a $300,000 loan made to a defaulted debtor.

Acquisition by Global Infrastructure Solutions, Inc. 
Global Infrastructure Solutions Inc. (GISI) and Hill International, Inc. announced their intent to conduct strategic merger in August 2022. The merger, the companies explained, presented enhanced opportunities for growth in global, for-fee infrastructure consulting markets. The merger was completed in December 2022 following regulatory approvals.

Final merger terms were lUS$3.40 per share from US$2.85. Hill shareholders representing approximately 72.9% of outstanding common shares approved the combination on November 2. As a GISI company, Hill continues to serve its clients under the Hill International brand as part of GISI’s Engineering & Consulting Services platform, along with sister companies The LiRo Group, GEI Consultants, J. Roger Preston Limited (JRP), and Asia Infrastructure Solutions.

As of January 2023, the company has approximately 3,200 employees in more than 100 offices all around the world. Engineering News-Record magazine ranks Hill as one of the largest construction management firms in the United States.

References

External links 
 

Companies based in Philadelphia
Companies listed on the New York Stock Exchange
Construction and civil engineering companies established in 1976
Construction and civil engineering companies of the United States
Business services companies established in 1976
1976 establishments in New Jersey